Sky Hook was a science fiction fanzine published by Redd Boggs from 1948 to 1957. It was nominated for the 1954 Retro-Hugo for Best Fanzine.

Contributors included Poul Anderson, James Blish, Philip Jose Farmer, Dean Grennell, David Keller, Virginia Kidd (as "Virginia Blish"), Sam Moskowitz, William Rotsler, and Jack Speer.

References

External links
 Sky Hook online at fanac.org

Defunct science fiction magazines published in the United States
Magazines established in 1948
Magazines disestablished in 1957
Science fiction fanzines